Patricia Marguerite Glibert is marine scientist known for her research on nutrient use by phytoplankton and harmful algal blooms in Chesapeake Bay. She is an elected fellow of the American Association for the Advancement of Science.

Education and career 
Glibert has an undergraduate degree from Skidmore College and a Master's degree from the University of New Hampshire where she examined the movement of nutrients in an estuary. Glibert moved to Harvard University for her Ph.D. which she earned in 1982 with a dissertation working on the uptake of ammonium by small marine organisms. Following her Ph.D., Glibert was a postdoctoral researcher and scientist at Woods Hole Oceanographic Institution. In 1986 Glibert moved to the University of Maryland where she was promoted to professor in 1993. 

In 2020, Glibert was elected president-elect of the Association for the Sciences of Limnology and Oceanography (ASLO), and will follow Roxane Maranger as president in 2022.

Research 
Glibert's research centers on nutrients, phytoplankton, and harmful algal blooms, especially the connection between harmful algal blooms and nutrients. She has conducted this research in multiple locations including Shinnecock Bay, Long Island, Florida Bay, the Chesapeake Bay, Kuwait Bay, the Scotian Shelf, the waters off Cape Cod, and Chesapeake Bay. She has examined the production and consumption of nitrogen, the effect of temperature on nutrient uptake, and the role of mixotrophy in nutrient use. Her work includes investigations into nutrient cycling in model organisms including Trichodesmium, Prorocentrum, and Synechococcus. Glibert's research encompasses issues of climate change and human impacts on the environment.

Selected publications

Awards and honors 
Glibert received an honorary doctorate from Linnaeus University in 2011, and was elected a fellow of the American Association for the Advancement of Science in 2012. She has also been named one of the top women professors in Maryland (2013), and is a sustaining fellow of the Association for the Sciences of Limnology and Oceanography (2016).

Personal life 
Glibert describes herself as "one-half dual-career couple" and is married to Todd Kana, a phytoplankton ecologist at the University of Maryland. In 2016 they published Aquatic Microbial Ecology and Biochemistry: A Dual Perspective, a collection written by dual career couples who have collaborated on research in the field. They have three children; Glibert's daughter was the first child born to a woman scientist at Woods Hole Oceanographic Institution.

References

External links 

 

Fellows of the American Association for the Advancement of Science
Skidmore College alumni
University of New Hampshire alumni
Harvard University alumni
University System of Maryland faculty
Biogeochemists
Women ecologists
Living people
Year of birth missing (living people)